The New Communist movement (NCM) was a diverse left-wing political movement principally within the United States, during the 1970s and 1980s. The NCM were a movement of the New Left that represented a diverse grouping of Marxist–Leninists and Maoists inspired by Cuban, Chinese, and Vietnamese revolutions. This movement emphasized opposition to racism and sexism, solidarity with oppressed peoples of the third-world, and the establishment of socialism by popular revolution. The movement, according to historian and NCM activist Max Elbaum, had an estimated 10,000 cadre members at its peak influence.

History

Origins 
The culture of post World War II America was deeply conservative, with most elements of radicalism and political leftism being suppressed through the anti-communist policies of Joseph McCarthy, which led to prosecution, detainment and blacklisting of hundreds of alleged Marxists.

The largest and most influential left-wing organization within the United States was the Communist Party, USA (CPUSA), which achieved peak influence during the Great Depression and World War II, before declining in the post war years due to a number of factors including state-repression (McCarthyism, Smith act, Rosenberg trial, etc.), as well as internal ideological schisms within the party. Members were often disillusioned by the party-leadership's official subordination to the USSR ideologically, with the party defending the numerous controversial actions by the Soviet state.

This would be a key moment in the Marxist movement in the United States and the world, with numerous ranking party members leaving the organization due to Krushchev's perceived Revisionism in pursuing the policy of Peaceful coexistence with the Capitalist West, which was perceived as a fundamental departure from the revolutionary socialism and anti-imperialist elements of Marxism–Leninism. The New Communist Movement was influenced by world events of the time, specifically the Cuban Revolution of 1959, the Chinese Cultural Revolution, The French May-Day Uprising, and the Black Power movement. Many of the early participants in the NCM were former members of the New Left student organization Students for a Democratic Society. 
The NCM emerged from numerous distinct movements in the United States during the late 1960s, with historian Max Elbaum, identifying Black Panther Party, Students for a Democratic Society, and the Progressive Labor Party.

Revolutionary Union / Revolutionary Communist Party 
One of the most prominent groups of the New Communist Movement was the Bay Area Revolutionary Union (later, shortened to Revolutionary Union), which was formed by activists Steve Hamilton, Leibel Bergman, Bob Avakian, and Bruce Franklin, and gained most of its membership from student radicals from the SDS.

The RU organized on a revolutionary anti-revisionist Marxist–Leninist–Maoist party line, with emphasis being placed on the Black liberation struggle and the liberation of all colonized peoples within and outside the United States, this political philosophy was elaborated in the 1969 pamphlet titled The Red Papers (later known as Red Papers I, after subsequent publications).

During the 1970s the RU began to gain influence within the anti-Vietnam War organization Vietnam Veterans Against the War/ Winter Soldier Organization with the RU dominated national council voting to controversially integrate itself into the RU in April 1975, resulting in a large number of members leaving the VVAW/WUO. The following September the RU officially voted to dissolve and reestablish itself into the Revolutionary Communist Party, USA.

October League 
The Communist Party (Marxist–Leninist)'s predecessor organization, the October League (Marxist–Leninist), was founded in 1971 by several local groups, many of which had grown out of the radical student organization Students for a Democratic Society when SDS split apart in 1969. Michael Klonsky, who had been a national leader in SDS in the late 1960s, was the main leader of the CP(M-L).

The October League came out of the Revolutionary Youth Movement II grouping in the SDS split. During the early 1970s the OL took positions that were at odds with most of the US Left, including opposition to gay liberation and support of the shah of Iran, whose regime they saw as a bulwark against Soviet social-imperialism.

The OL established influence within some of the established civil rights organizations, including the Southern Christian Leadership Conference and the Southern Conference Educational Fund, which had been under the influence of the Moscow-oriented Communist Party USA.

In late 1975 they organized a "National Fight Back Conference," which drew 1,000 participants and was attended by representatives of the August 29th Movement, the Congress of Afrikan People and the Marxist–Leninist Organizing Committee of San Francisco. They also had a youth group called the Communist Youth Organization.

Greensboro massacre 

On November 3, 1979, four members of the Communist Workers' Party (CWP) and a male protester were killed by members of the Ku Klux Klan and the American Nazi Party (ANP) during a Death to the Klan march, organized by the CWP. The event had been preceded by inflammatory rhetoric from both sides. The CWP had originally come to Greensboro to support workers' rights activism among mostly black textile industry workers in the area. The march was a part of that larger effort. The Greensboro city police department had an informant within the KKK and ANP group who notified them that the Klan was prepared for armed violence.

Rainbow Coalition 
The Rainbow Coalition was a multicultural movement founded April 4, 1969 in Chicago, Illinois by Fred Hampton of the Black Panther Party, along with William "Preacherman" Fesperman of the Young Patriots Organization and Jose Cha Cha Jimenez founder of the Young Lords. It was the first of several 20th century Black-led organizations to use the "rainbow coalition" concept.

1970s and 1980s 
As one of its last initiatives, SDS had begun to leave its campus base and organize in working-class neighborhoods. Radical militant groups such as Weather Underground are recognized as participants in the movement. Some former members subsequently developed local organizations that continued the trend, and they attempted to find theoretical backing for their work in the writings of Vladimir Lenin, Mao Zedong and Joseph Stalin. Maoism was then highly regarded as more actively revolutionary than the brand of communism supported by the post-Stalin Soviet Union (see New Left: New Left in the United States). As a result, most NCM organizations referred to their ideology as Marxism–Leninism-Mao Zedong Thought and rejected what they saw as the devolution of socialism in the contemporary Soviet Union.

Similar to the New Left's general direction in the late 1960s, these new organizations rejected the post-1956 Communist Party USA as revisionist, or anti-revolutionary, and also rejected Trotskyism and the Socialist Workers Party for its theoretical opposition to Maoism.

The groups, formed of ex-students, attempted to establish links with the working class through finding work in factories and heavy industry, but they also tended toward Third-worldism, supporting National Liberation Fronts of various kinds, including the Black Panther Party (then on the decline), the Cuban Revolution, and the National Front for the Liberation of Vietnam. The New Communist Movement organizations supported national self-determination for most ethnic groups, especially blacks and those of Latino origin, in the United States. These organizations addressed problems of sexism and racism, partly by voicing adamant support for self-determination and identity politics, and felt that they were dealing with problems they were of the opinion had not been addressed in the groups of the 1960s. However, different NCM groups came to this similar conclusion via quite different routes.

In its early years, NCM organisations formed a loose-knit tendency in United States leftist politics, but never coalesced into a single organization. As time went on, the organizations became extremely competitive and increasingly denounced one another. Points of distinction were frequently founded on the attitude taken toward the successors of Mao and international disputes between the Soviet Union and China regarding such developments as the Angolan Civil War. The Revolutionary Union organized the founding congress of the Revolutionary Communist Party, USA in 1975.

The October League organized the founding congress of the Communist Party (Marxist–Leninist) in 1977. During this period a few other new communist movement organizations also formed new communist parties.

Unlike the majority of NCM groups, the Dodge Revolutionary Union Movement (DRUM), which evolved into the League of Revolutionary Black Workers (LRBW), was formed by factory workers rather than student activists. The AFL–CIO leadership supported the Vietnam War and sought to avoid strikes, but union workers saw through this and independently organized a series of wildcat strikes. Radical Marxist and other African-American auto workers subsequently formed DRUM. From 1968 to 1971 DRUM and the league acted as a dual union, with black leadership, within the United Auto Workers. In the late 1970s a group labeled the May 19th Communist Organization was created, going on a bombing campaign.

In 1979, after the publishing of Enver Hoxha's Imperialism and the Revolution and other criticisms of Maoism from Albania, some groups renounced Maoism in favour of an "orthodox Marxist–Leninist" line similar to that of the Albanian communists. Many of these groups such as the Marxist–Leninist Organizing Committee and Sunrise Collective formed together in a joint statement against the end of Chinese aid to Albania. The U.S. Marxist–Leninist Party, previously the Central Organization of U.S. Marxist-Leninists, would become the primary recognized vanguard party in the United States supported by Albania, although Albanian aid to the American communists was minimal due to fears of CIA infiltration. Other groups such as the Red Dawn Organization and Pacific Collective (Marxist–Leninist) would meet with similarly pro-Albania groups in the 1979 in an attempt to unite and form a single communist party.

Legacy 
The New Communist Movement as a whole became smaller in the 1980s. The militant May 19th Communist Organization was dissolved. Some organizations dissolved in the early 1980s, such as the Communist Party (Marxist–Leninist).  The Revolutionary Communist Party USA remains as an original product of the New Left. The Revolutionary Workers Headquarters and Proletarian Unity League joined forces to form the Freedom Road Socialist Organization in 1985, and various other new communist movement collectives and organizations later merged into FRSO. Subsequently, in 1999, FRSO split into two organizations, both of which until 2019 continued to use the name Freedom Road Socialist Organization.

Homophobia 
The groups and individuals representing the movement were persistently hostile towards homosexuality and homosexuals, reflecting both the homophobia within the United States, as well as homophobic tendencies within the larger international Marxist–Leninist movement, although gay rights activism was an early component of the New Left. The Revolutionary Union considered homosexuality as "an individual response to male supremacy and male chauvinism."

Attitude towards the Khmer Rouge 
Anarcho-communist Libcom.org contributor Loren Goldner sharply criticized the legacy of the NCM in a review of Max Elbaum's Revolution in the Air, accusing both Elbaum and the wider NCM movement of supporting the Khmer Rouge regime that held control over Cambodia from 1975 to 1979, before being deposed by the Socialist Republic of Vietnam in the Cambodian–Vietnamese War. In a 1978 issue of The Call editor Dan Burstein called for solidarity between American activists and the Khmer Rouge regime.

Attitude towards the Shining Path 
The Revolutionary Communist Party endorsed Shining Path, a Maoist revolutionary group that formed from the Peruvian Communist Party (PCP).  In 1980 Shining Path launched a “People’s War” against the Peruvian state that has since resulted in around 70,000 deaths. It has been widely condemned for its human rights abuses.

Influences 
 Frantz Fanon, anti-colonialist writer and existentialist philosopher. 
 Mao Zedong, military leader of the Chinese Revolution, General Secretary of the CCP. 
 Huey Newton, leader and co-founder of the Black Panther Party, deeply influenced by Maoism and Black Nationalism
 Amílcar Cabral
 Kwame Nkrumah
 Stokely Carmichael 
 Fidel Castro, leader of the July 25th Movement and the Cuban Revolution
 Harry Haywood, CPUSA member, anti-racist activist, anti-revisionist
 William Z. Foster, anti-revisionist member of the CPUSA
 Bobby Seale, co-founder of the Black Panther
 Vladimir Lenin, leader of the Bolshevik Party during the October Revolution
 Joseph Stalin, paramount leader of Soviet Union 
 Ho Chi Minh, leader of the Vietnamese revolution and the Democratic Republic of Vietnam
 Ernesto "Che" Guevara, prominent member of the 26 July Movement
 Thomas Sankara, Maxist-Leninist, Panafricanist, leader of Burkina Faso
 Herbert Marcuse, Frankfurt school philosopher, writer, and cultural critic. 
 Elaine Brown, leader of the Oakland Black Panther Party
 Malcolm X
 Enver Hoxha, First Secretary of the Party of Labour of Albania, leader of communist Albania.

Organizations

Predecessors 
 Provisional Organizing Committee for a Communist Party
 Bay Area Revolutionary Union
 Black Panther Party 
 Dodge Revolutionary Union Movement
 Revolutionary Youth Movement II
 Students for a Democratic Society
 Young Pioneers of America
 Communist Party, USA
 Progressive Labor Party
 Peace and Freedom Party

Organizations of the 1970s and 1980s 
 Young Patriots Organization
 Black Panther Party
 Committee for a Proletarian Party
 Communist Organization, Bay Area
 Communist Labor Party of North America
 Communist Party (Marxist–Leninist)
 Communist Workers Party
 Georgia Communist League
 League of Revolutionary Struggle
 Marxist-Leninist Party, USA
 May 19th Communist Organization
 National Guardian
 National Labor Federation
 October League
 Organization for Revolutionary Unity
 Proletarian Unity League
 Revolutionary Communist Party, USA
 Revolutionary Union
 Revolutionary Workers Headquarters
 Revolutionary Workers Organization
 Sojourner Truth Organization
 Venceremos Organization
 Weather Underground

Current descended organizations 
 Freedom Road Socialist Organization
 Revolutionary Communist Party, USA
 Progressive Labor Party
 Workers World Party 
 Party for Socialism and Liberation

Prominent figures

Revolutionary Union/Revolutionary Communist Party (1968–present) 
 Steve Hamilton
 Bob Avakian, present Chairman
 Leibel Bergman
 H. Bruce Franklin

Communist Workers Party 
 Michael Nathan
 James Michael Waller

Black Liberation Army 
 Assata Shakur

October League 
 Lynn Wells

Weather Underground Organization 
 Bill Ayers
 Bernardine Dohrn
 David Gilbert
 Kathy Boudin

Others 
 General Baker
 Irwin Silber, editor of Guardian
 Marian Kramer
 Lynn Wells
 George Jackson
 Max Elbaum
 Angela Davis, Black Panther Party member, prison abolitionist, presidential candidate for CPUSA. 
 Harry Hay, prominent member of Gay Liberation Front, Mattachine Society, and the Radical Fairies.

See also 
 Black Power movement
 Communism in the United States
 Revisionism (Marxism)

References

Further reading

Print 
 Aaron J. Leonard and Connor A. Gallagher, Heavy Radicals - The FBI's Secret War on America's Maoists: The Revolutionary Union / Revolutionary Communist Party 1968-1980. (Zero Books, 2018) 
 Avakian, Bob. From Ike to Mao and Beyond: My Journey from Mainstream America to Revolutionary Communist: A Memoir (Insight Press, 2005)
 Lovell, Julia. Maoism: A Global History. (Borzoi Books, 2019). 
 Elbaum, Max., Revolution in the Air: Sixties Radicals Turn to Lenin, Mao, and Che. (London: Verso, 2003).
 Waller, Signe. Love And Revolution: A Political Memoir: People's History Of The Greensboro Massacre, Its Setting And Aftermath. London & New York: Rowman & Littlefield. 2002. .

Articles 
 Paul Saba, "Theoretical Practice in the New Communist Movement: An Interview with Paul Saba," Viewpoint Magazine, August 25, 2015.
 Micah Uetrich, "What Today's Socialists Can Learn From the 1970s New Communist Movement: An interview with Max Elbaum, author of Revolution in the Air." In These Times, Aug. 16, 2018.
 Micah Uetricht. "Learning from the New Communist Movement". Jacobin. September 20, 2018.
 Ethan Young. "Everything You Wanted to Ask About Sects ... But Were Afraid to Know". Jacobin. July 20, 2018.
 Max Harman. "The Sect System". Libcom. March 19, 2018.
 Aaron J. Leonard The Missing Chapter in the History of America's Sixties Radicals. History News Network, February 22, 2015.

Primary sources 
 The Movement for a Revolutionary Left. The New Communist Movement: An Obituary. "Marxists.org." March, 1981. 
 RCYM. Take the War to the People. The Revolutionary Youth Movement newspaper, 1969.

Anti-revisionist organizations
Communist organizations in the United States
Defunct American political movements
Far-left politics in the United States
Maoist organizations in the United States
Maoism in the United States
New Left
Opposition to United States involvement in the Vietnam War
Political history of the United States